is a novel by Japanese writer and Nobel Prize winner Yasunari Kawabata first published in 1926.

Plot

The narrator, a twenty-year-old student from Tokyo, travels the Izu Peninsula during the last days of the summer holidays, a journey which he undertook out of a feeling of loneliness and melancholia. His paths repeatedly cross with a troupe of five travelling musicians, one man and four women, while heading for Mount Amagi tunnel. He is impressed by the beauty of the youngest looking woman in the troupe, who carries a heavy drum, and decides to follow them.

After traversing the tunnel, Eikichi, the troupe's male leader, starts a conversation with him, telling him that he and his companions are from Ōshima Island and on a short tour before the cold season sets in. In Yugano, where the group rests for the night, the narrator learns from Eikichi that the young woman, Kaoru, is his 14 year old sister. The other troupe members are Eikichi's wife Chiyoko, his mother-in-law, and a maid. In the evening, the musicians entertain guests in another inn in the village. The student hears Kaoru playing her drum, worrying if she might be harassed by her listeners.

The next day, the narrator witnesses the naked Kaoru coming out of the bath house, waving at him. The sight makes him laugh, realising that she is still a young, innocent girl. Although the day of his return to Tokyo is approaching, he accepts the musicians' offer to keep them company for another day. During a walk, the student overhears Kaoru and Chiyoko saying what a nice person he is, which enlightens him and distracts him both from his melancholia and from the fact that the group are poor, uneducated people. Eikichi's mother-in-law invites him to their home during his winter holidays, but later forbids Kaoru to accompany him to the cinema.

The next morning, the student enters a boat in Shimoda which takes him back to Tokyo, seen off by Eikichi and the grieving Kaoru. On the boat, he starts to cry, saddened by the parting but at the same time sensing a feeling of relief.

Publication history
The Dancing Girl of Izu was first published in Bungei Jidai magazine in two parts in 1926 and in book form by Kinseido in 1927.

Reception and legacy
Reviewing the 1997 American publication, Mark Morris in The New York Times called The Dancing Girl of Izu a "deceptively simple story […] about cleansing, purification", pointing out for one the "effacement of adult female sexuality and its replacement by an impossible white void of virginity", a common theme with Kawabata, as well as the protagonist's "personal absolution", received from people constantly living with the "stigma of social exclusion".

In his review of a 2000 anthology, Donald Richie rated The Dancing Girl of Izu as Kawabata's most famous and popular work, an autobiographical and "seemingly artless […] evocation of first love itself".

Translations
The Dancing Girl of Izu was first translated into English by Edward Seidensticker, being the first story by Kawabata which saw an English translation, and published in an abridged form as The Izu Dancer in The Atlantic Monthly in 1955. Later publications contained Seidensticker's complete translation of the story. A new English translation was provided by J. Martin Holman in 1997.

Adaptations

Films
The Dancing Girl of Izu (1933), starring Kinuyo Tanaka and Den Obinata, directed by Heinosuke Gosho
Izu no odoriko (1954), starring Hibari Misora and Akira Ishihama, directed by Yoshitarō Nomura
Izu no odoriko (1960), starring Haruko Wanibuchi and Masahiko Tsugawa, directed by Yoshirō Kawazu
Izu no odoriko (1963), starring Sayuri Yoshinaga and Hideki Takahashi, directed by Katsumi Nishikawa
Izu no odoriko (1966), starring Yōko Naitō and Toshio Kurosawa, directed by Hideo Onchi
Izu no Odoriko (1974), starring Momoe Yamaguchi and Tomokazu Miura, directed by Katsumi Nishikawa

Television
Kawabata's story has also been dramatised for Japanese television numerous times, including a 1993 version starring Takuya Kimura.

Popular culture
The novel is well known in Japan, and today, Odoriko (lit. "dancing girl") is used as the name of express trains to the Izu area.

References

Novels by Yasunari Kawabata
1926 Japanese novels
Japanese novels adapted into films
Japanese novels adapted into television shows